The Al-Moskobiya, Moscobiyeh, Muscovite or Moscovia Detention Centre is an Israeli detention and interrogation facility and prison more commonly known as The Russian Compound, located in West Jerusalem. The center is used to interrogate Palestinian detainees and prisoners from a variety of age groups, including children. The Palestinian NGO Addameer has alleged that harsh methods of torture are used there.

History 
During the British Palestine Mandate the center was known as 'the central prison'. It has been claimed that the prison especially became notorious due to its harsh torture techniques throughout the 1980s.

In 1990, it was reported that the jail was used mainly for Palestinians fighting Israeli occupation of the West Bank and Gaza Strip. Both the Moscovia Detention Centre and the nearby Museum of Underground Prisoners are yellow brick buildings that were built as part of a complex of hostels and a green-domed church for pilgrims by the Russian Orthodox Church in the 1860s.

Popular culture 
In 2017 a documentary by director Raed Andoni was released called Ghost Hunting ( Iṣṭiyād ʾAšbāḥ). The movie, which explores the trauma of former prisoners of the Detention Center, was first screened in Ramallah for an audience consisting for ninety percent of former prisoners.

References

Israel Defense Forces
Prisons in Israel
Buildings and structures in Jerusalem
Russian Compound